Events in the year 1951 in Brazil.

Incumbents

Federal government
 President: Marshal Eurico Gaspar Dutra (till 30 January); Getúlio Vargas (from 31 January)
 Vice President: Nereu Ramos (till 30 January); Café Filho (from 31 January)

Governors 
 Alagoas: Silvestre Pericles (till 31 January); Arnon de Mello (from 31 January)
 Amazonas: Leopoldo da Silva Amorim Neves (till 31 January); Álvaro Botelho Maia (from 31 January)
 Bahia: Otávio Mangabeira then Régis Pacheco
 Ceará: Faustino de Albuquerque (till 31 January); Raul Barbosa (from 31 January)
 Espírito Santo: Carlos Fernando Monteiro Lindenberg (till 31 January); Jones dos Santos Neves (from 31 January)
 Goiás: Hosanah Guimarães (till 31 January); Pedro Ludovico Teixeira (from 31 January)
 Maranhão: 
 Mato Grosso: Jari Gomes then Fernando Corrêa da Costa
 Minas Gerais: Milton Soares Campos (till 31 January); Juscelino Kubitschek (from 31 January)
 Pará: 
 till 25 January: Alberto Engelhard
 25 January-27 January: Waldir Bouhid
 27 January-9 February: Arnaldo Lobo 
 9 February-20 February: Abel Nunes de Figueiredo
 starting 20 February: Zacarias de Assumpção
 Paraíba: Osvaldo Trigueiro (till 31 January); José Américo de Almeida (from 31 January)
 Paraná: Moisés Lupion then Bento Munhoz da Rocha Neto
 Pernambuco: Alexandre Barbosa Lima Sobrinho (till 31 January); Agamenon Magalhães (from 31 January)
 Piauí: José da Rocha Furtado (till 31 January); Pedro Freitas (from 31 January)
 Rio de Janeiro: Macedo Soares (till 31 January); Amaral Peixoto (from 31 January)
 Rio Grande do Norte: 
 until 31 January: José Augusto Varela 
 31 January-16 July: Jerome Dix - Sept Rosado Maia
 from 16 July: Silvio Piza Pedrosa
 Rio Grande do Sul: Walter Só Jobim (till 31 January); Ernesto Dornelles (from 31 January)
 Santa Catarina: Aderbal Ramos da Silva (till 31 January); Irineu Bornhausen (from 31 January)
 São Paulo: Ademar de Barros (till 31 January); Lucas Nogueira Garcez (from 31 January)
 Sergipe: 
 till 31 January: Jose Rollemberg
 31 January-17 February: João Dantas Martins dos Reis
 17 February-12 March Edélzio Vieira de Melo
 from 12 March: Arnaldo Rollemberg Garcez

Vice governors
 Alagoas: Francisco de Menezes Pimentel (till 31 January); Antônio Guedes de Miranda (from 31 January)
 Ceará: Stênio Gomes da Silva 
 Espírito Santo: José Rodrigues Sette (till 31 January); Francisco Alves Ataíde (from 31 January)
 Goiás: Jonas Ferreira Alves Duarte (from 31 January)
 Maranhão: Saturnino Bello (till 31 January); Renato Bayma Archer da Silva (from 31 January)
 Mato Grosso: João Leite de Barros (from 31 January)
 Minas Gerais: José Ribeiro Pena (till 31 January); Clóvis Salgado da Gama (from 31 January)
 Paraíba: José Targino Pereira da Costa (till 31 January); João Fernandes de Lima (from 31 January)
 Piauí: Osvaldo da Costa e Silva (till 31 January); Tertuliano Milton Brandão (from 31 January)
 Rio de Janeiro: Tarcísio Miranda (from 31 January)
 Rio Grande do Norte:
 till 31 January: Tomaz Salustino
 31 January-16 July: Sylvio Pedroza
 from 16 July: vacant thereafter
 São Paulo: Luís Gonzaga Novelli Júnior (till 31 January); Erlindo Salzano (from 31 January)
 Sergipe: Edelzio Vieira de Melo (from 31 January)

Events
March - Clarice Lispector returns from London with her husband, Maury Gurgel Valente, following a miscarriage.
1 June -  Última Hora, a tabloid newspaper, is founded by Samuel Wainer and personally endorsed by President Vargas. 
October - João Carlos Muniz of Brazil is President of the United Nations Security Council.
November - Elizabeth Bishop, on a traveling fellowship from Bryn Mawr College, arrives in Santos with the aim of circumnavigating South America by boat.
date unknown 
The Brazilian Medical Association is founded.
The Escola Superior de Propaganda e Marketing is founded in São Paulo.

Arts and culture

Books
Ștefan Baciu - Analiza cuvântului dor

Films
Agüenta Firme, Isidoro, directed by Luiz de Barros. 
Aí Vem o Barão, directed by Watson Macedo, starring Oscarito, José Lewgoy and Eliana.
Amazon Symphony, directed by Anelio Latini, starring Almirante.
Quando a Noite Acaba, starring Tônia Carrero.
O Saci, directed by Rodolfo Nanni, starring Paulo Matozinho.

Births
9 April - Sérgio Rezende, filmmaker
29 April - Vinicius Cantuária, jazz musician
12 July - Carlos Minc, geographer, environmentalist and politician 
13 August - Beto Guedes, singer, songwriter, and guitarist
14 August - Rita Segato (in Argentina), anthropologist, feminist and academic
20 October - José Gomes Temporão, doctor and politician

Deaths
2 August - Joseph Franz Seraph Lutzenberger, German-born architect and artist (born 1882)
13 November - Walter de Souza Goulart, footballer (born 1912)

References

See also 
1951 in Brazilian football
List of Brazilian films of 1951

 
1950s in Brazil
Years of the 20th century in Brazil
Brazil
1951 in South America